Juliusz Wyrzykowski (June 6, 1946 – November 11, 2002) was a Polish movie and stage actor.

Biography 
Juliusz Wyrzykowski was born on June 6, 1946 in Warsaw. He was the son of actors Marian Wyrzykowski and Elżbieta Barszczewska. In 1957 he made his debut in the movie King Maciuś I as the title character. In 1971 he graduated National Academy of Dramatic Art in Warsaw and for the whole professional life he was associated with Polish Theatre in Warsaw. He died on November 18, 2002 in Warsaw.

Filmography

Movie 
 1957: King Maciuś I – Maciuś I
 1976: Bezkresne łąki – Karol
 1985: Głód – father of Joachim
 1989: Stan strachu – actor
 1992: Wszystko, co najważniejsze – music teacher

TV Theatre 
 1971: Szafir jak diament – physician
 1972: Otworzyć serce – patient
 1974: Wszystko dobre, co się dobrze kończy – page-boy
 1975: Zawodowy gość – news vendor
 1975: Pogrążyć się w mroku – mechanic
 1975: Piknik – Bomba
 1976: Wystarczy jeden telefon – Gabi
 1981: The Wedding – devil
 1990: Człowiek z budki suflera – waiter
 1995: Paths of Glory – captain Tanon

TV-Serie 
 1986: Zmiennicy (episode 10: Krzyk ciszy) – Turkish writer
 1991: Pogranicze w ogniu (episode 11) – expert
 1994: Zespół adwokacki (episode 9) – judge regarding to Kudela vs Chmielnik
 1994: Spółka rodzinna (episode 3) – Krzak
 1996: Dom (episode 14: Ta mała wiolonczelistka) – a man in train

Documentary film 
 1983: Na odsiecz Wiedniowi – sekretary of Palavicini

Other Works 
 1990: Na czysto

References

External links 
 Juliusz Wyrzykowski at the Internet Movie Database
 Juliusz Wyrzykowski at the Filmweb
 Juliusz Wyrzykowski at the fdb.pl

Polish male film actors
Polish male stage actors
1946 births
2002 deaths